Zaza Rising is a 2017 Rwandan short film produced by Lena Strothe.

Synopsis 
Christine Nyirahabimana, starts a small bakery in rural Rwanda and hires 10 HIV positive, single mothers as her employees. She inspires as an example of how one individual can eradicate poverty despite all odds.

Festivals 

 Virginia Film Festival, 2018
 Sydney Indie Film Festival, 2018
 African Diaspora Film Festival, 2018

References

External 
Zara Rising at IMDb

Rwandan short documentary films
2017 films
2017 short documentary films